Olavarría Airport  is an airport serving Olavarría, a city in the Buenos Aires Province of Argentina.

The Olavarria non-directional beacon (Ident: OLA) is located on the field.

See also

Transport in Argentina
List of airports in Argentina

References

External links
OpenStreetMap - Olavarria Airport

Airports in Argentina